Marie-Jeanne Renard du Bos (1701 – between 1730 and 1750) was a French engraver.

Biography
She was probably born in Paris and became a pupil of Charles Dupuis. She engraved several paintings, including a painting by Francoise Basseporte of a woman at half-length stroking a rabbit, that was published in Versailles immortalisée in 1720. She was mentioned for this in Louis-Marie Prudhomme's dictionary of famous women. Prudhomme claimed the year of her death was unknown in 1830.

She probably died in Paris.

References

Further reading

External links 
 Marie-Jeanne Renard Dubos at the Web Gallery of Art

1701 births
1740s deaths
French engravers
Artists from Paris
Women engravers
18th-century engravers
18th-century French women artists
French women printmakers
18th-century French artists